is the fourth single by Berryz Kobo, released on August 25, 2004. The single entered the Oricon Weekly Singles Chart at number 20, with 11,000 copies setting a record for Berryz Kobo's first week sales.

Details 
 Main vocalists: Miyabi Natsuyaki, Risako Sugaya (centre), Momoko Tsugunaga, Yurina Kumai

Track listing 
  (Music and lyrics: Tsunku. Arrangement: Suzuki Shunsuke)
  (Music and lyrics: Tsunku, Arrangement: Suzuki Shunsuke)
 "Happiness (Kōfuku Kangei!)" (Instrumental)

PV versions 
 Normal version
 Dance-shot version
 Close-up version (group)

References

External links 
 Happiness ~Kofuku Kangei!~ entry on the Up-Front Works official website
 J-Ongaku:Happiness (Kōfuku Kangei!) 
 Jpop Stop!:Happiness (Kōfuku Kangei!) 

2004 singles
Songs written by Tsunku
Berryz Kobo songs
Song recordings produced by Tsunku
2004 songs
Piccolo Town singles